Poolova is a village in Y. Ramavaram Mandal, East Godavari district in the state of Andhra Pradesh in India.

Demographics 
 India census, This Village had a population of 162, out of which 64 were male and 98 were female. Population of children below 6 years of age was 21.6%. The literacy rate of the village was 67.02%.

References 

Villages in Y. Ramavaram mandal